Antti Aarre Nurmesniemi (30 August 1927 in Hämeenlinna – 11 September 2003 in Helsinki) was a Finnish designer. He is perhaps best known for his coffee pots and his interior design work.

Biography
Antti Nurmesniemi's work includes enamel coffee pots and furniture such as the Jakkara sauna stool, as well as interior design work. He has been referred to as the "Grand Old Man of Finnish Design", and he won the Lunning Prize in 1959.

He was married to textile designer Vuokko Eskolin-Nurmesniemi, known for her striped designs for Marimekko.

Nurmesniemi was involved in the modernist design of the Palace Hotel from 1951–1953. with Olli Borg and Olavi Hänninen.

Eero Aarnio worked for him for a short time, and they are credited together in at least one source for the Ball Chair design in the 1960s. Mary Quant put the chair in her Bond Street store known for mod fashions. Aarnio also came up with the Bubble Chair, while Nurmesniemi designed the steel and leather covered poly-foam Triennale chair in 1960; Tecta Möbel's F 10 fiberglass, rubber, aluminum and chrome plated steel chair in 1968; the chrome and fabric covered foam Tuoli chair sold by Cassina in 1978; and the wicker and tubular steel D 35 ca. 1984.

Works

Antti Nurmesniemi: ajatuksia ja suunnitelmia (Reflecting and Designing), Kaupungin taidemuseo. (Helsinki) 1992.

References

1927 births
2003 deaths
People from Hämeenlinna
Finnish designers